F. B. Culley Generating Station is a 369 megawatt (MW) coal power plant located southeast of Newburgh in Warrick County, Indiana. It sits on the north bank of Ohio River, immediately adjacent and upstream of the Warrick Power Plant, and is owned and operated by Vectren (formerly Southern Indiana Gas and Electric Company).

History
F. B. Culley has two units still in service: a 104 MW Unit 2 (built in 1966) and a larger 265 MW Unit 3 (built in 1973). Unit 1 with 46 MW, began electricity generation in 1955. The unit closed in 2006 in order to comply with the Environmental Protection Agency's (EPA) Clean Air Interstate Rule. It was announced in February 2018 that F. B. Culley's Unit 2 will be shut down in 2023.

Environmental impact
In 1992, Vectren installed a flue-gas desulfurization (FGD) system on Units 2 and 3 to reduce sulfur dioxide emissions and satisfy the requirement of the EPA's Acid Rain Program. From 2001 to 2005, Vectren installed four selective catalytic reduction (SCR) devices on the coal-fired units, which successfully cut nitrogen oxide emissions by 80 percent. In 2006, a fabric filter was installed at Unit 3 to further reduce particulate matter emissions.

See also

 List of power stations in Indiana

References

External links
 Barges hauling coal up the Ohio River with the F. B. Culley and Warrick Power Stations in the background

Energy infrastructure completed in 1955
Energy infrastructure completed in 1966
Energy infrastructure completed in 1973
Coal-fired power stations in Indiana
Buildings and structures in Warrick County, Indiana
1955 establishments in Indiana